Psammaechidius is a genus of silvanid flat bark beetles in the family Silvanidae. There is one described species in Psammaechidius, P. spinicollis.

References

Further reading

 
 

Silvanidae